Bavayia astrongatti is a species of geckos endemic to New Caledonia.

This species is endangered by habitat degradation and loss caused by wildfires, as well as the introduced electric ant (Wasmannia auropunctata), which may both directly exclude the lizard from its habitat and affect the invertebrate fauna which it predates.

References

Bavayia
Reptiles described in 2022
Taxa named by Aaron M. Bauer
Taxa named by Ross Allen Sadlier
Taxa named by Todd R. Jackman
Geckos of New Caledonia